The 2021 Conference USA women's soccer tournament was the postseason women's soccer tournament for Conference USA held from November 1 through November 7, 2021. The nine-match tournament took place at FAU Soccer Stadium in Boca Raton, Florida. The ten-team single-elimination tournament consisted of four rounds based on seeding from regular season conference play. The defending champions were the Rice Owls. Rice was unable to defend their title after being defeated by Middle Tennessee in the Quarterfinals. The Old Dominion Monarchs won the title by defeating Southern Miss in the final 1–0. The conference championship was the first for the Old Dominion women's soccer program and first for head coach Angie Hind. As tournament champions, Old Dominion earned C-USA's automatic berth into the 2021 NCAA Division I Women's Soccer Tournament.

Seeding 

Ten teams qualified for the 2021 tournament based on their regular season records.  The top five teams in each division were selected for tournament play.  The tournament was set up so the first round matched the fourth seed and fifth seed of each conference and the quarterfinals featured cross-conference play.  One tiebreaker was required between Rice and UAB, both of which finished 4–3–1 and tied for second place in the West Region.  Rice won the tiebreaker and was awarded the second seed in the West based on their 2–1 overtime victory over UAB on October 8.

Bracket

Source:

Schedule

First Round

Quarterfinals

Semifinals

Final

Statistics

Goalscorers

All-Tournament team

Source:

* Offensive MVP
^ Defensive MVP

References 

Conference USA Women's Soccer Tournament
2021 Conference USA women's soccer season